Carron railway station served the village of Carron, Speyside, Scotland from 1863 to 1968 on the Strathspey Railway.

History 
The station opened on 1 July 1863 by the Great North of Scotland Railway. When it opened, there was only one platform but another was later added. To the north was a goods yard and to the west were sidings that served the Imperial distillery. The station closed to both passengers on 18 October 1965 and closed to goods on 4 November 1968. The signal box has survived.

References

External links 

Disused railway stations in Moray
Railway stations in Great Britain opened in 1863
Railway stations in Great Britain closed in 1965
Beeching closures in Scotland
1863 establishments in Scotland
1968 disestablishments in Scotland
Former Great North of Scotland Railway stations